Blumbergs (masculine), Blumberga (feminine), is the Latvian-language spelling of the surname Blumberg. Notable people with this surname include:

 Agnese Blumberga (born 1971), Soviet and Latvian tennis player
  (1919-2014), Latvian sculptor
 Santa Blumberga (born 1994), Latvian curler and coach

Latvian-language masculine surnames
Surnames of German origin